North Delhi is an administrative district of the National Capital Territory of Delhi in India. Alipur is the administrative headquarters of this district. North Delhi is bounded by the Yamuna River and the district of Central Delhi on the east and by the district of North West Delhi to the west. 

Administratively, the district is divided into three subdivisions,  Model Town, Narela, and Alipur.

Demographics
According to the 2011 census North Delhi had a population of 887,978, roughly equal to the nation of Fiji or the US state of Delaware. This gives it a ranking of 468th in India (out of a total of 640). Its population growth rate over the decade 2001-2011 was 13.04%. North Delhi had a sex ratio of 871 females for every 1000 males, and a literacy rate of 86.81%.

After reorganization, the new North Delhi district had a population of 1,405,723, of which 1,236,984 (88.00%) lived in urban areas. North Delhi had a sex ratio of 852 females per 1000 males. Scheduled Castes made up 262,648 (18.68%) of the population.

At the time of the 2011 census, 85.84% of the population spoke Hindi, 4.71% Punjabi, 1.82% Bhojpuri 1.80% Haryanvi, 1.26% Bengali and 1.21% Urdu as their first language.

See also
 Districts of Delhi

References

External links
 North Delhi District official website

Districts of Delhi